Ashish Ranjeet Deshmukh  was the member of the 13th Maharashtra Legislative Assembly. He represented the Katol Assembly Constituency. He resigned from  the Bharatiya Janata Party Deshmukh is the son of former president of Maharashtra Pradesh Congress Committee and former Maharashtra minister Ranjeet Deshmukh. In December 2013, Deshmukh had undertaken an indefinite fast to press for formation of a separate Vidarbha state.

Early life
Dr. Ashish Deshmukh was born to Roopa Deshmukh and Ranjeet Deshmukh, an Ex-Cabinet Minister Maharashtra and MLA from Ramtek belongs to Party Indian National Congress.

Deshmukh has authored a book titled Gramvikasacha Password in December 2015.

Education
Deshmukh also has a post-graduate degree of Engineer in Industrial Specialisation. 
MBA Finance & also completed his PhD.

Political career
He was member of 13th legislative assembly, Maharashtra [M.L.A.] He strongly contested assembly elections in 2019 against the then chief minister. Recently, he became a part of the Indian National Congress.

Associated With
 Chairman, No Tobacco Organization
 Founder, YOUTH for INDIA
 Founder Member, Vidarbha Progressive Farmers Association
 Chairman, Arvind Sahakari Bank Ltd.
 Treasurer, Lata Mangeshkar Hospital Trust, Nagpur, Lata Mangeshkar Hospital
 Working president, VSPM Academy of Higher Education, Nagpur
 Treasurer, Madhuribai Deshmukh Seva Pratisthan, Vadvihira, District : Panjab
 President, foodball Association of India
 Chairman, International Council for Sports Promotion  & Research
 Vice President, Asian woodball association 
 Working president, Arvindbabu Deshmukh Pratishthan Journalism Awards

Positions held

Within BJP

 MLA Since 2014 Katol till 2019

Legislative
Member, Maharashtra Legislative Assembly - 2014 to 2019

References

Politicians from Nagpur
Living people
1979 births
Maharashtra MLAs 2014–2019
People from Nagpur district
Bharatiya Janata Party politicians from Maharashtra
Marathi politicians